Club Deportivo Guadalcacín is a Spanish football team based in , Province of Cádiz, in the autonomous community of Andalusia. Founded in 1954, it plays in Tercera División – Group 10, holding home games at Estadio Municipal Antonio Fernández Marchán.

Season to season

5 seasons in Tercera División

External links
 
Fútbol Regional team profile 
La Preferente team profile 

Football clubs in Andalusia
Association football clubs established in 1954
Sport in Jerez de la Frontera
1954 establishments in Spain